This is a list of universities in Rwanda.

Post-secondary institutions

As at December 2015, there are 34 institutions of higher education in Rwanda, 11 public and 23 private. In 2013, the government of Rwanda merged all public universities, leading to one public university, University of Rwanda, with six colleges.

Public university
 University of Rwanda (UR)
 College of Agriculture and Veterinary Medicine (CAVM)
 College of Arts and Social Sciences (CASS)
 College of Business and Economics (CBE)
 College of Education (CE)
 College of Medicine and Health Sciences (CMHS)
 College of Science and Technology (CST)

Public integrated polytechnics and colleges
 Gishari Integrated Polytechnic (GIP)
 Institute of Legal Practice and Development (ILPD)
 Integrated Polytechnic Regional College Ngoma(IPRC-Ngoma)
 Integrated Polytechnic Regional College Kigali (IPRC-Kigali)
 Integrated Polytechnic Regional College Huye (IPRC-Hye)
 Integrated Polytechnic Regional College Karongi (IPRC-Karongi)
 Musanze Polytechnic College (Musanze Campus)
 Rwanda Teachers College (RTC)
 Integrated Polytechnic Regional College Tumba (IPRC-Tumba)
 Community Integrated Polytechnic (CIP)
 Integrated Polytechnic Regional College Rusizi(IPRC-Rusizi)

Public nursing schools
 Byumba School of Nursing And Midwifery
 Kibungo School of Nursing And Midwifery
 Nyagatare School of Nursing And Midwifery
Rwamagana School of Nursing

Private universities

 Eastern African Christian College (EACC)
 Kigali Integrated College (KIC)
 University of Kigali (UoK)
 Ruli Higher Institute of Health (RHIH)
 University of Lay Adventists of Kigali (UNILAK) 
 Adventist University of Central and East Africa (AUCA)
African Leadership University (ALU)

 Akilah Institute for Women, Kigali (AIWK)
East African University Rwanda
 Carnegie Mellon University Rwanda (CMUR)
 Catholic Institute of Kabgayi (ICK) 
 Catholic University of Rwanda (CUR)
 Christian University of Rwanda (CHUR). Closed in 2020 by Government of Rwanda.
 Hanika Anglican Integrated Polytechnic (HAIP)
 University Of Kibungo (UNIK)
 Muhabura Integrated Polytechnic College (MIPC)
 Institute of Applied Sciences Ruhengeri (INES)
 Institut Superieur Pedagogique de Gitwe (ISPG)
 Kibogora Polytechnic (KP)
 Premier ECDE Teachers College (PECDTC) 
 Kigali Independent University (ULK)
 KIM University 
 Mount Kenya University Kigali Campus (MKU Kigali)
 Protestant Institute of Arts & Social Sciences (PIASS)
 University of Tourism, Technology and Business Studies (UTB)
 University of Technology and Arts of Byumba (UTAB)
 University of Global Health Equity

References

Universities in Rwanda
Universities
Rwanda
Rwanda